Peter Cousens' Kookaburra: The National Musical Theatre Company was an Australian not-for-profit theatre company dedicated to musical theatre.

History 
Kookaburra was founded by Australian musical theatre performer Peter Cousens in 2006 and received high-profile support from many luminaries of the Australian stage, the Australian Federal government and a variety of businesses. Throughout its short career it
produced seven musicals, two major concerts and fourteen cabaret events.

The company experienced financial challenges and cancelled productions, and caused controversy when Stephen Sondheim demanded an apology and threatened to remove rights after major cuts were made to Company when an actor with no understudy could not perform.  It officially closed in March 2009, reportedly with thousands of dollars owing to creative staff and $1.6 million in debt.  Although Cousens credited the company's downfall to the "global financial crisis", many people involved in the company and in the industry cited severe mismanagement.

Productions 
 Pippin (Sydney Theatre, 2007)
 Company (Theatre Royal, 2007) - nominated for Best Musical at the 2008 Helpmann Awards
 Tell Me on a Sunday (Seymour Centre and tour, 2008)
 Little Women (Seymour Centre, 2008)
 The Emperor's New Clothes (NSW Schools Tour)
 Songs for a New World (NSW Schools Tour)
 I Love You, You're Perfect, Now Change (NSW Tour)

References 

Theatre companies in Australia
Musical theatre companies
Theatre in Sydney